Volkameria is a genus of flowering plants in the family Lamiaceae. It is pantropical in distribution. Many of the species are found in coastal habitats.

The species of Volkameria are mostly shrubs, sometimes subshrubs or lianas, rarely small trees. The stems have swollen nodes. The flowers are usually fragrant. The fruit matures black or brown, separating into four corky pyrenes.

Volkameria aculeata and Volkameria glabra are grown as ornamentals in the tropics. Volkameria heterophylla is also known in cultivation. Volkameria inermis is planted as a sand binder.

Species
 Volkameria acerbiana Vis. - northeastern Africa from Egypt to Tanzania and west to Chad; also Guinea-Bissau + Gambia in West Africa 
 Volkameria aculeata L. - West Indies, northern South America, Honduras, Veracruz State in eastern Mexico 
 Volkameria aggregata(Gürke) Mabb. & Y.W.Yuan - Madagascar 
 Volkameria eriophylla (Gürke) Mabb. & Y.W.Yuan - eastern + southern Africa from Tanzania to Namibia 
 Volkameria glabra (E.Mey.) Mabb. & Y.W.Yuan - western + southern Africa from South Africa to Somalia; Seychelles, Comoros 
 Volkameria heterophylla Poir. - Mauritius, Réunion; naturalized in India, Madagascar, Australia 
 Volkameria inermis L. - China, Indian Subcontinent, Australia, Pacific Islands 
 Volkameria ligustrina Jacq. - Mexico, Central America 
 Volkameria mollis (Kunth) Mabb. & Y.W.Yuan - Panama, Colombia, Ecuador, Peru, Galápagos 
 Volkameria pittieri (Moldenke) Mabb. & Y.W.Yuan - Guatemala, Nicaragua, Costa Rica, Panama, Colombia, Venezuela, Ecuador

History 
Volkameria was originally named (as "Volcameria") by German botanist Lorenz Heister in Index plantarum rariorum (1730), the name subsequently being adopted by Swedish scientist Carl Linnaeus and validly published in his Species Plantarum (1753). Heister named the genus after the German botanist Johann Georg Volckamer the Younger (1662-1744), who had described the plant in his Flora Noribergensis (1700).

In 1895, John Isaac Briquet defined the genus Clerodendrum broadly, to include all of those species now placed in Rotheca, Clerodendrum, Volkameria, and Ovieda. This was considered questionable by many, but for the next 100 years, Briquet's circumscription was usually followed, mostly because of confusion and uncertainty regarding this group of at least 200 species.

In 2010, a molecular phylogenetic analysis of DNA sequences showed that most of the Clerodendrum species that had been in Volkameria were more closely related to Aegiphila, Ovieda, Tetraclea, and Amasonia than to other species of Clerodendrum. (See the phylogenetic tree at Lamiaceae). Following these results, Volkameria was reinstated. Some species that had been erroneously placed in Volkameria were excluded. Some of the poorly known species in Clerodendrum might still need to be transferred to Volkameria.

Gallery

References

External links 
 Volkameria At:Index Nominum Genericorum At: References At: NMNH Department of Botany
 Volkameria In: volume 2 Of: Species Plantarum At: Biodiversity Heritage Library
 CRC World Dictionary of Plant Names: R-Z At: Botany & Plant Science At: Life Science At: CRC Press

Lamiaceae
Lamiaceae genera
Taxa named by Carl Linnaeus
Pantropical flora